Horopito was a station on the North Island Main Trunk line, in the Ruapehu District of New Zealand. It served the small village of Horopito and lies just to the north of two of the five largest NIMT viaducts. It and Pokaka also lay to the south of Makatote Viaduct, the late completion of which held up opening of the station.

A passing loop remains at the station site.

History 

Surveying for the route between Hīhītahi and Piriaka began in 1894. The line opened from Waiouru to Rangataua for goods traffic on 12 August 1907 and a mail coach ran between the railheads at Raurimu and Rangataua, serving Horopito on the way. A stationmaster was appointed by March 1908.

A telephone line from the north was in place by 1907, but a link to Mataroa was not installed until 1909.

In August 1908 Horopito was the point where engines were changed on the first through train, to reduce its weight to negotiate the still unballasted track to the north.

Work on the station building began in November 1908. A 5th class station was built by September 1909 for around £3,340. There was a tablet and fixed signals. Railway workers cottages were built from 1907. A crossing loop could take 60 wagons, extended to 80 in 1955. Electric lighting was installed after 1924.

The station building was replaced by a prefabricated shelter shed in 1971. On 19 September 1986 the station closed to all traffic.

Gallery

Timber 
Like the other stations along this part of NIMT, Horopito had freight from several timber mills.

Berg Brothers had a mill from at least 1908 to 1921, with a horse-drawn tramway. A tramway to the Mangaturuturu valley was still in use in 1938. Mr Harland built a mill for cutting manoao into sleepers in 1909. Cowern & Co had several tramways east of the station. Another sawmill had a short tramway south of the station. Orata Mill burnt down in the 1918 Raetihi fire, but was still working in 1924.

Viaducts 
Two of NIMT's main viaducts are to the south of Horopito, where the line crosses valleys descending steeply from Mount Ruapehu. Both were designed by Peter Seton Hay, supervised by Resident Engineer, Frederick William Furkert, both had  radius curves, and both were replaced on 29 June 1987 by a  deviation, begun in 1984. As early as the 1960s there had been calls to bypass the viaducts, as they'd had a  speed restriction, due to their tight radius, since the 1930s. Hapuawhenua Viaduct would have also required costly underpinning. The old viaducts were transferred to the Department of Conservation, in a like for like swap of land between DoC and the Railways Department. From Saturday 14 February 2009 they became part of the Mountains to Sea Trail.

Both viaducts are made up of lattice steel piers on concrete footings, supporting 36 ft (11m) plate steel spans, interspersed with 64 ft (20m) Pratt truss steel girders. The lattice piers were built a tier at a time, using guy lines attached to derricks. Access to the pier heads was by ladder. The pier head girders weighed about 3½ tons, and the truss girders 9½ tons. They were positioned with derricks. The steelwork was prepared at PWD's Mangaonoho workshop, near the southernmost of the main viaducts. It was railed northwards to the Hapuawhenua valley floor, over a temporary, sharply curved and graded,  line from Ohakune, which was built in 1906. Material for Taonui was then carted along the coach road.

There are also bridges over one of the tributaries of the Toanui, and a, bridge over the Makotuku River, which is just south of Horopito. Makotuku Viaduct was one of those on NIMT built by Andersons of Christchurch.

Taonui Viaduct 
It replaced the original curved viaduct, to the west.

That viaduct, further down the Taonui Stream, opened in February 1908. It has 3 steel piers supportlng the central spans. The southern end has a concrete pier and abutments. Taonui was decked by February 1908, allowing coach passengers to walk across, while their coach wound around the road below. It was the first of 5 viaducts in the last portion of the NIMT to be finished, but the rails couldn't be linked to Ohakune until Hapuawhenua was ready in April 1908.

On 18 and 19 March 1918 the Raetihi Fire damaged  of sleepers, some of the parapet and set a truck on a goods train alight. The only significant additions were strengthening in 1934 and 1971.

After the deviation opened, the rails and decking were removed and some of the cuttings leading to it were filled with spoil from the new deviation. When the listing report was done in 2009, almost all the red-lead primer, last applied in 1964, was exposed and there was some rusting. There was also a comment that the footings could be adversely affected by moisture trapped by the vegetation. Plans to route the cycle trail over the viaduct have been shelved.

Hapuawhenua Viaduct 
It too was rebuilt in 1987.

Further up the Hapuawhenua Stream, to the east, remains the viaduct completed in April 1908.

By August 1907 the preparation of the Hapuawhenua site was complete and excavation of the footings began. Abutments and 13 concrete piers were complete by December 1907. Work had also begun on the 4 central steel piers, which were finished in January 1908.

Strengthening was done between 1925 and 1934, and again in 1971. It was painted in 1964, and telephone wire insulators were added to the western side.

When the deviation opened in 1987 the rails were removed and a walkway created using old sleepers and a new handrail.

In 1988 the viaduct was used by AJ Hackett for what may have been the first commercial bungy jumping in the world.

Old Coach Road 
 of the Makatote-Ohakune Old Coach Road has been restored between Horopito and Ohakune. It mostly followed the route (with the exception of the section to Taonui Viaduct) of a bridle track completed in 1886, which had been upgraded to a dray road in 1895. It was mostly paved between 1904 and November 1906, mainly with setts to create an all-weather road for construction material along the line. From 11 November 1906 it was also used to carry passengers and goods between the northern and southern railheads, though as late as May 1907 there were complaints of mud making some parts impassable. From 1 November 1907 Ohakune became the southern terminal. About  of the road was not paved, being covered only with pumice. After the opening of SH49 it fell into disuse. Like the viaducts, it has a Category I Historic Places status, though much later, from 5 October 2004, and was re-opened from 2009 as part of a cycle trail.

References

External links 

Photos –

 1907 Taonui construction with derrick
 1914 mixed train at station
 1919 Berg's sawmill
 1921 horse tramway
 1931 station and stationmaster
 1936 wagons in station yard
 1987 Taonui Viaduct

Railway stations in New Zealand
Rail transport in Manawatū-Whanganui
Buildings and structures in Manawatū-Whanganui
Railway stations opened in 1907
Railway stations closed in 1986
Ruapehu District